Nathaniel Richard Hemsley (born May 15, 1974) is a former American football linebacker in the National Football League for the Dallas Cowboys, Miami Dolphins and Carolina Panthers. He played college football at Syracuse University.

Early years
Hemsley grew up in Delran Township, New Jersey and graduated from Delran High School in 1991. As a senior, he received second-team All-American, All-Freedom League, AllBurlington County and Defensive Player of the Year honors.

He accepted a football scholarship from Syracuse University. As a redshirt freshman in 1993, he was named the started at inside linebacker and led the team in total tackles with 81, while also tallying 2 tackles for loss, 2 passes defensed and one blocked kick. 

In 1994, he was lost for the season with a knee injury he suffered in the season opener against the University of Oklahoma, where he had 10 tackles and one fumble recovery. As a junior, he started 11 games at outside linebacker, making 119 tackles (second on the team), 3.5 sacks.

As a senior, in 1996, he posted 106 tackles (led the team), 6 tackles for loss (third on the team), 3 sacks, 4 quarterback pressures, 3 passes defensed,  while being named First-team All-Big East.

Professional career

Houston Oilers
Hemsley was signed as an undrafted free agent by the Houston Oilers after the 1997 NFL Draft on April 21. He was waived on August 13.

Dallas Cowboys
On September 3, 1997, he was signed to the Dallas Cowboys' practice squad. On December 10, he was promoted to the active roster for the last 2 games to play on special teams. On August 31, 1998, he was re-signed by the Cowboys. After appearing in three games playing on the short-yardage defense and on special teams, he was injured while covering a punt and was placed on the injured reserve list with a dislocated right ankle and a broken leg on October 5. He was cut by the Cowboys on October 27, 1999.

Miami Dolphins
Over a year later, on November 14, 2000, he was signed by the Miami Dolphins to their practice squad. On February 19, 2001, he was re-signed to a two-year contract. He was then cut on August 28.

Carolina Panthers
On October 3, 2001, he was signed by the Carolina Panthers. He appeared in 9 games (3 starts), before being released on March 20, 2002.

References

External links
Hemsley's Debut At Vet Delayed The Pride Of Delran High, Now A Dallas Cowboy, Is Out With A Broken Leg

1974 births
Living people
Delran High School alumni
People from Delran Township, New Jersey
People from Willingboro Township, New Jersey
Sportspeople from Burlington County, New Jersey
Players of American football from New Jersey
American football linebackers
Syracuse Orange football players
Dallas Cowboys players
Miami Dolphins players
Carolina Panthers players